Vijay Gokhale is an Indian Marathi and Hindi film and television actor and director. In 1995 he acted in the television series Shrimaan Shrimati.

Filmography

Director 
 Dum Asel Tar (2012)
 Bharat Aala Parat (2007)

Actor 
 Hi Mummy Hi Daddy
 Dum Asel Tar
 Parambi (2011)
 Mamachya Rashila Bhacha
 Tata Birla Ani Laila
 Asami Kay Gunha Kela
 Bhagam Bhag
 Chala Khel Khelu Ya Doghe
 Saline Kela Ghotala
 Zhak Marali Bayko Keli
 Bharat Aala Parat
 Mumbaicha Dabewala
 Baba Lagin
 Mahercha Nirop
 Hi Poragi Konachi
 Polisachi Bayko
 Gharandaaj
 Sar Kas Shant Shant
 Ek unaad divas

Television 
 Shrimaan Shrimati (1995-1999) as Gokhale
 Hum Aapke Hai Woh (1996-1998)
 Ghar Jamai (1997) as Pandit (Guest Role only in episode no. 39)
Family No.1(1998) as Bholaram (Guest Role only in episode no. 17)
 Dil Vil Pyar Vyar (1998-1999)
 C.I.D. (India TV series) (2002)
 Hum Sab Ek Hain (1999-2000)
 Saat Phero Ki Hera Pherie

References

External links 
 

Living people
Male actors in Marathi cinema
Marathi film directors
Indian male television actors
Marathi actors
Year of birth missing (living people)